The Ven. Robert Sydney Dell, MA (20 May 1922 – 19 January 2008) was Archdeacon of Derby from 1973  to 1992.

He was educated at Harrow County School for Boys, Emmanuel College, Cambridge  and Ridley Hall, Cambridge. He was ordained in 1948. His first posts were curacies in  Islington and Cambridge. He was then successively: Chaplain at  Wrekin College., Vicar of Mildenhall, Suffolk, Vice-Principal of Ridley Hall, Cambridge, Vicar of Chesterton, Cambridge and  Canon Residentiary at Derby Cathedral.

Notes

1922 births
People educated at Harrow High School
Alumni of Emmanuel College, Cambridge
Alumni of Ridley Hall, Cambridge
Archdeacons of Derby
2008 deaths